The 1994 Preakness Stakes was the 119th running of the Preakness Stakes thoroughbred horse race. The race took place on May 21, 1994, and was televised in the United States on the ABC television network. Tabasco Cat, who was jockeyed by Pat Day, won the race by three quarters of a lengths over runner-up Go For Gin.  Approximate post time was 5:32 p.m. Eastern Time. The race was run over a fast track in a final time of 1:56-2/5.  The Maryland Jockey Club reported total attendance of 99,834, this is recorded as second highest on the list of American thoroughbred racing top attended events for North America in 1994.

Payout 

The 119th Preakness Stakes Payout Schedule

$2 Exacta:  (2–3) paid   $34.20

$2 Trifecta:  (2–3–1) paid   $160.40

The full chart 

 Winning Breeder: Overbrook Farms & David P. Reynolds; (KY) 
 Final Time: 1:56 2/5
 Track Condition: Fast
 Total Attendance: 99,834

See also 

 1994 Kentucky Derby

References

External links 

 

1994
1994 in horse racing
1994 in American sports
1994 in sports in Maryland
Horse races in Maryland